West Worlington is a small village and former civil and ecclesiastical parish in Mid-Devon, England. It is situated about 2 miles west of Witheridge. In the parish is the historic estate, formerly a separate parish, of Affeton, the ancient seat of the Stucley family. Through the parish flows the Little Dart River. The parish church is dedicated to St Mary. In 1885 the parish was merged for civic administrative purposes into the neighbouring small parish of East Worlington, and in 1919 it was merged into the ecclesiastical parish of East Worlington, the parish church of which is also dedicated to St Mary, to form a single ecclesiastical parish.

References

West Worlington
Civil parishes in Devon